Mount Adishi also known as Hadishi, is a peak in the central part of the Greater Caucasus Mountain Range. The mountain is made up of paleozoic granites. The slopes of Adishi are covered by glaciers.

See also
Adishi Glacier

References 
 Georgian State (Soviet) Encyclopedia. 1975. Book 1. p. 96.

Mountains of Georgia (country)
Svaneti
Four-thousanders of the Caucasus